Podocarpus rotundus is a species of conifer in the family Podocarpaceae. It is found in Indonesia and the Philippines.

References

rotundus
Data deficient plants
Taxonomy articles created by Polbot
Taxobox binomials not recognized by IUCN